The 2004–05 New York Islanders season was the 33rd season in the franchise's history. However, its games were cancelled as the 2004–05 NHL lockout could not be resolved in time.

Off-season
The Islanders chose Petteri Nokelainen as their first-round choice, sixteenth overall.

Schedule
The Islanders regular season schedule was announced on July 14, 2004. Their preseason schedule was announced on July 16, 2004.

|-
| 1 || September 23 || @ New York Rangers
|-
| 2 || September 26 || New York Rangers
|-
| 3 || October 1 || New Jersey Devils
|-
| 4 || October 3 || Philadelphia Flyers
|-
| 5 || October 5 || @ Philadelphia Flyers
|-
| 6 || October 8 || @ New Jersey Devils
|-
| 7 || October 9 || @ Boston Bruins
|-

|-
| 1 || October 16 || Carolina Hurricanes
|-
| 2 || October 19 || Boston Bruins
|-
| 3 || October 20 || @ New Jersey Devils
|-
| 4 || October 23 || @ Washington Capitals
|-
| 5 || October 26 || New Jersey Devils
|-
| 6 || October 28 || @ Boston Bruins
|-
| 7 || October 30 || Los Angeles Kings
|-
| 8 || November 1 || Tampa Bay Lightning
|-
| 9 || November 3 || @ Minnesota Wild
|-
| 10 || November 4 || @ St. Louis Blues
|-
| 11 || November 6 || Florida Panthers
|-
| 12 || November 9 || Toronto Maple Leafs
|-
| 13 || November 11 || Nashville Predators
|-
| 14 || November 13 || Dallas Stars
|-
| 15 || November 15 || New York Rangers
|-
| 16 || November 17 || @ Philadelphia Flyers
|-
| 17 || November 19 || @ Atlanta Thrashers
|-
| 18 || November 20 || @ Washington Capitals
|-
| 19 || November 22 || @ New York Rangers
|-
| 20 || November 24 || Montreal Canadiens
|-
| 21 || November 26 || Pittsburgh Penguins
|-
| 22 || November 27 || Philadelphia Flyers
|-
| 23 || November 30 || Ottawa Senators
|-
| 24 || December 3 || @ Buffalo Sabres
|-
| 25 || December 4 || Carolina Hurricanes
|-
| 26 || December 6 || Washington Capitals
|-
| 27 || December 10 || @ Philadelphia Flyers
|-
| 28 || December 11 || @ Pittsburgh Penguins
|-
| 29 || December 14 || @ Toronto Maple Leafs
|-
| 30 || December 17 || @ New York Rangers
|-
| 31 || December 18 || Washington Capitals
|-
| 32 || December 21 || @ Detroit Red Wings
|-
| 33 || December 23 || @ New Jersey Devils
|-
| 34 || December 26 || @ Ottawa Senators
|-
| 35 || December 30 || Anaheim Mighty Ducks
|-
| 36 || December 31 || @ Carolina Hurricanes
|-
| 37 || January 2 || Detroit Red Wings
|-
| 38 || January 4 || Florida Panthers
|-
| 39 || January 6 || New Jersey Devils
|-
| 40 || January 8 || Buffalo Sabres
|-
| 41 || January 11 || Colorado Avalanche
|-
| 42 || January 14 || @ Pittsburgh Penguins
|-
| 43 || January 15 || Phoenix Coyotes
|-
| 44 || January 18 || @ Toronto Maple Leafs
|-
| 45 || January 20 || @ Edmonton Oilers
|-
| 46 || January 21 || @ Calgary Flames
|-
| 47 || January 23 || @ Vancouver Canucks
|-
| 48 || January 25 || New York Rangers
|-
| 49 || January 27 || @ Buffalo Sabres
|-
| 50 || January 29 || Buffalo Sabres
|-
| 51 || February 1 || Philadelphia Flyers
|-
| 52 || February 3 || Ottawa Senators
|-
| 53 || February 5 || Columbus Blue Jackets
|-
| 54 || February 6 || @ Montreal Canadiens
|-
| 55 || February 9 || @ Carolina Hurricanes
|-
| 56 || February 10 || @ Tampa Bay Lightning
|-
| 57 || February 15 || Atlanta Thrashers
|-
| 58 || February 17 || @ Tampa Bay Lightning
|-
| 59 || February 19 || @ Florida Panthers
|-
| 60 || February 21 || Pittsburgh Penguins
|-
| 61 || February 22 || @ Montreal Canadiens
|-
| 62 || February 24 || San Jose Sharks
|-
| 63 || February 26 || @ New Jersey Devils
|-
| 64 || February 28 || @ Boston Bruins
|-
| 65 || March 4 || @ Pittsburgh Penguins
|-
| 66 || March 5 || New York Rangers
|-
| 67 || March 7 || Atlanta Thrashers
|-
| 68 || March 11 || Montreal Canadiens
|-
| 69 || March 13 || Boston Bruins
|-
| 70 || March 15 || @ Phoenix Coyotes
|-
| 71 || March 17 || @ Los Angeles Kings
|-
| 72 || March 20 || @ Chicago Blackhawks
|-
| 73 || March 22 || Tampa Bay Lightning
|-
| 74 || March 25 || @ New York Rangers
|-
| 75 || March 26 || New Jersey Devils
|-
| 76 || March 28 || @ Philadelphia Flyers
|-
| 77 || March 29 || Pittsburgh Penguins
|-
| 78 || April 1 || @ Florida Panthers
|-
| 79 || April 2 || @ Atlanta Thrashers
|-
| 80 || April 5 || Toronto Maple Leafs
|-
| 81 || April 8 || @ Ottawa Senators
|-
| 82 || April 9 || Philadelphia Flyers
|-

Transactions
The Islanders were involved in the following transactions from June 8, 2004, the day after the deciding game of the 2004 Stanley Cup Finals, through February 16, 2005, the day the  season was officially cancelled.

Trades
The Islanders did not make any trades.

Players acquired

Players lost

Signings

Draft picks
The Islanders picks at the 2004 NHL Entry Draft, which was held at the RBC Center in Raleigh, North Carolina on June 26–27, 2004.

Farm teams
Bridgeport Sound Tigers

Notes

References

New York Islanders seasons
New York Islanders
New York Islanders
New York Islanders
New York Islanders